SOV Windermere is a subsea operations vessel built in 2010 for Hallin Marine.

She was leased by the Royal Australian Navy to supplement its amphibious lift fleet from the 14 October 2011 to 31 January 2012. The option to extend the lease until the end of February 2012 was not taken up.

References

2009 ships